Toi music (Той) is a genre of popular folk music originated from Central Asia. This genre of music is popular in countries like Uzbekistan, Kazakhstan and Kyrgyzstan.

Etymology 
The meanings of toi or tой in several Turkic languages are either celebration, gathering, or wedding. This is due to the fact that toi music usually played at social gatherings, where toi musicians usually invited to perform in it.

References 

20th-century music genres
Kazakhstani popular music
Kazakhstani styles of music
Kyrgyzstani popular music
Kyrgyzstani styles of music
Uzbekistani popular music
Uzbekistani styles of music